Carlos Moros Gracia (born 15 April 1993) is a Spanish footballer who plays for Swedish club Djurgårdens IF as a central defender.

Club career
Born in Sagunto, Valencian Community, Moros was a Valencia CF youth graduate. On 8 August 2012 he moved to hometown side Atlético Saguntino in Tercera División, and made his senior debut during the campaign.

In May 2015, Moros moved abroad for the first time in his career after accepting a scholarship program at the Temple University in Philadelphia. He played for the soccer team named Temple Owls, being named captain in his second season.

On 30 March 2017, Moros switched teams and countries again, after agreeing to a two-year deal with Swedish club GIF Sundsvall. He made his professional debut on 22 July, coming on as a substitute for fellow debutant David Batanero in a 2–2 away draw against Halmstads BK for the Allsvenskan championship.

References

External links
Carlos Moros profile at Temple Owls

1993 births
Living people
People from Sagunto
Sportspeople from the Province of Valencia
Spanish footballers
Footballers from the Valencian Community
Association football defenders
Tercera División players
Ekstraklasa players
I liga players
Allsvenskan players
Atlético Saguntino players
GIF Sundsvall players
ŁKS Łódź players
Mjällby AIF players
Spanish expatriate footballers
Spanish expatriate sportspeople in the United States
Spanish expatriate sportspeople in Sweden
Expatriate soccer players in the United States
Expatriate footballers in Sweden
Expatriate footballers in Poland
Spanish expatriate sportspeople in Poland